David Smyth is the former head coach for the BYU rugby team and current head coach for the Southern Virginia University rugby team. Smyth played for BYU rugby in the 1980s. Smyth coached the BYU rugby team from 1991–2002, and after taking a break, has been the head coach since 2005. BYU rugby claimed its first national championship in 2009, and Smyth was selected as college coach of the year for the 2008–09 season by American Rugby News.

Smyth is one of the architects of the Varsity Cup Championship that was created in 2012. Smyth participated in forming the Varsity Cup out of a desire to create a flagship competition for college rugby where universities would control the playoff structure. Smyth led BYU rugby to the Varsity Cup title in 2013 and again in 2014, beating Cal both times.

BYU results
Smyth has led BYU to several successful seasons, with BYU finishing as the top or one of the top teams in the country in post-season tournaments and in national rankings.

References

Living people
American rugby union coaches
Year of birth missing (living people)